Helianthus paradoxus, the paradox sunflower, puzzle sunflower or Pecos sunflower, is a threatened species of sunflower found only in west Texas, Utah, and New Mexico salt marshes by the edges of inland salt lakes and salt flats.

Helianthus paradoxus formed 75,000-208,000 years ago as a hybrid of H. annuus, the common sunflower, and Helianthus petiolaris, the prairie sunflower. The hybrid is more tolerant of salt than either parent species.  Helianthus paradoxus is found in areas with salinity levels range from 10 to 40 parts per thousand. Due to its ability to withstand such high levels of salt, H. paradoxus is considered to be a halophyte.

Pecos sunflower is an annual, herbaceous plant. The stem and leaf surfaces have a few short, stiff hairs. Flowers are produced in September and October, much later than many other sunflowers.

This species was added to the Endangered Species Act on October 20, 1999. It is found in spring seeps, wet meadows, pond margins, and stream courses. All these populations are dependent on natural groundwater deposits.

References

External links
 USDA Plants Profile for Helianthus paradoxus
 Center for Plant Conservation.org: conservation status of Helianthus paradoxus
 The Nature Conservancy.org: Helianthus paradoxus info
 NMrareplants.unm.edu: photo + description

paradoxus
Salt marsh plants
Flora of New Mexico
Flora of Texas
Flora of Utah
Endemic flora of the United States
Endangered flora of the United States
Plants described in 1958